Before The League  is a documentary series on the history of professional American football that ultimately became the NFL. The series debuted at the Pro Football Hall of Fame on October 27, 2015. The film is broken into a six parts which tell the story of the evolution from rugby to the formation and creation of the American Professional Football Association in 1920. The series aired on Time Warner Cable SportsChannel on November 17 and 18, 2015.

The series was awarded several times including in the prestigious Emmy Awards and national Telly Awards in 2016. Before The League director and executive producer Jason Pheister and lead writer and executive producer Alison Momeyer, were each awarded Emmys for their roles. In total, the series received three Emmy Awards, five Emmy nominations, and five Telly Awards.

The series examines how small towns like Canton and Massillon, Ohio were the blueprint for fielding early pro football teams as well as fostering healthy rivalries. As precursors to the current day NFL, teams like the Akron Pros, Dayton Triangles, Columbus Panhandles, Portsmouth Spartans, Ironton Tanks, Shelby Blues, Oorang Indians, Rochester Jeffersons, Buffalo All-Americans, Milwaukee Badgers, and Green Bay Packers laid the groundwork for the successes of today's big city NFL teams. The series focuses mainly on the Ohio League, the NFL's most immediate predecessor, while also making note of other regional teams and circuits such as the western Pennsylvania conference and New York Pro Football League.

Actors and historians
The documentary film is narrated by Chuck Campbell.

Several noted historians of pro football give background information including Joe Horrigan, author and Pro Football Hall of Fame lead historian and head of communications and exhibits; Kate Buford, author and biographer of Jim Thorpe; Chris Willis, author of several books, including the biography of Joe Carr; Keith McLellan, author of "The Sunday Game;" Jeffrey J. Miller, author of "Buffalo's Forgotten Champions;" and John Steffenhagen, historian of the Rochester Jeffersons and great-grandson of NFL co-founder Leo Lyons. Additionally, Hall of Fame Running Back Floyd Little provides his perspective on the subject.

Episodes

References 

2010s American documentary television series
2015 American television series debuts
2015 American television series endings
Television series about the history of the United States
National Football League television series